Khalid Mahmud Chowdhury (born 1 January 1970) is a Bangladesh Awami League politician and the incumbent Member of Parliament representing the Dinajpur-2 constituency. He is  the current State Minister of Shipping of Bangladesh. He is also the Organizational Secretary of Bangladesh Awami League.

Early life
Chowdhury was born on 31 January 1970. He has a bachelor's degree in commerce.

Career
Chowdhury was elected to parliament from Dinajpur-2 in 2008, 2014 and 2018 for consecutive three times. He is the Organizing Secretary of Bangladesh Awami League. In September 2018, he asked people in the region not to worry about the National Register of Citizens, being carried out in India. He said this while on a trip to India. He was named state minister of shipping on 6 January 2019 in the 4th cabinet of Sheikh Hasina.

References

Living people
1970 births
Awami League politicians
9th Jatiya Sangsad members
10th Jatiya Sangsad members
11th Jatiya Sangsad members
State Ministers of Shipping